Borki is a rural locality (a settlement) in Kabansky District, Republic of Buryatia, Russia. The population was 184 as of 2010. There are 2 streets.

Geography 
Borki is located 20 km northwest of Kabansk (the district's administrative centre) by road. Tvorogovo is the nearest rural locality.

References 

Rural localities in Kabansky District